28 grader i skuggan (28 Degrees in the Shade) is the fifth studio album by Swedish pop music artist Mauro Scocco. It was released in 1994 through Scocco's own record label Diesel Music.

Four singles were released from the album: "Överallt" (Everywhere), "Gå samma väg" (Go the Same Way), "Går ut med mig själv" (Going Out with Myself), and "Hel igen" (Whole Again). The album peaked at number one on the Swedish Albums Chart.

Track listing

Charts

References

Other sources
 mauroscocco.se (requires login)

Mauro Scocco albums
1994 albums
Swedish-language albums